Raihanah (also known as Rayhanah) is an Indian playback singer and composer for films. She is the sister of A. R. Rahman and mother of G. V. Prakash Kumar and Bhavani Sree. Her first song being Malle Malle from the movie Chocolate for which the composer was music director Deva and produced by Madesh and directed by Venkatesh. She collaborated with A. R. Rahman on a song for the score of the award-winning Kannathil Muthamittal in 2005. The most recent song she has sung is Saarattu Vandiyila from Kaatru Veliyidai for which the director is Maniratnam. She also sang Balleilakka along with S.P.Balasubramanium and Benny Dayal in the movie Sivaji. She has also sung various songs in Kannada and Telugu. She has composed for more than 6 tamil movies and has composed one song in a Malayalam movie Vasanthathinde kanal vazhigalil. She has composed jingles for various brands, like Madhurai Kumaran Silks, Suguna motors,  Dazzler nail polish etc.  She is the goodwill ambassador of a youth-based social organization called Raindropss

Filmography

As a singer
"Madurai Jilla" – Shree
"Vidaikodu Engal" – Kannathil Muthamittal
"Malle Malle" – Chocolate
"Aahaa Thamizhamma" – Kangalal Kaidhu Sei
"Paarthale Paravasam" – Parthale Paravasam
"Balleilakka" – Sivaji: The Boss
"Keda Kari" – Raavanan
"Naan Yen" – Coke Studio (Season 3) at MTV (2013)
"Ennile Maha Olio" – Coke Studio (Season 3) at MTV (2013)
"Karma Veeran" – "Kochadaiiyaan"
"Putham Puthithaai" – "Kadaisi Pakkam (Upcoming Film)"
"Saarattu Vandiyila" – Kaatru Veliyidai 
"Ponni Nadhi" – Ponniyin Selvan: I 
"Morethukuchindi" – Cheliyaa

As a composer
Machi (2004)
Aadatha Aattamellam (2009)
Pesuvathu Kiliya (2009)
Kadhalagi (2010)
Ennai Etho Seithu Vittai (2011)
Manchottile Veedu (2012)
Vasanthathinte Kanal Vazhikalil (2014)
Puriyadha Anandam Puthithaga Arambam (2015)
Kadaisi Pakkam (2015)
Yenda Thalaiyila Yenna Vekkala (2018)

As a producer
Yenda Thalaiyila Yenna Vekkala (2018)

References

External links

 Interview with Kamla Bhatt for NDTV: I knew Rahman would go international: Reihana
 Joint Scene India entry: A.R. Reihana

Living people
Indian women playback singers
21st-century Indian singers
Tamil playback singers
Tamil film score composers
Tamil musicians
Telugu playback singers
Indian Muslims
Year of birth missing (living people)
21st-century Indian women singers
Singers from Tamil Nadu
Women musicians from Tamil Nadu
Indian Sufis
Qadiri order